Trachelyopterichthys is a genus of driftwood catfishes found in tropical South America.

Species 
There are currently two described species in this genus:
 Trachelyopterichthys anduzei Ferraris & Fernández, 1987
 Trachelyopterichthys taeniatus (Kner, 1858) (Striped woodcat)

References

Auchenipteridae
Fish of South America
Taxa named by Pieter Bleeker
Catfish genera